Mellon ('Future') was a Greek-language socialist weekly newspaper, founded in 1909. Mellon was published from Athens, the first issue came out in March 1909. The newspaper was founded by Dionysios Kokkinos. The modern Greek literature scholar A. Steinmetz, was Kokkinos' most important collaborator.

References

1909 establishments in Greece
Greek-language newspapers
Defunct newspapers published in Greece
Publications established in 1909
Newspapers published in Athens
Weekly newspapers published in Greece